Hello Panda is a brand of Japanese biscuit, manufactured by Meiji Seika. It was first released in Japan during 1979. Each biscuit consists of a small hollow shortbread layer, filled with crème of various flavors. On some biscuits are printed cartoon style depictions of giant pandas doing various activities, such as fencing and archery, and also in the United States, other activities such as hockey and baseball.

Hello Panda was originally baked in Japan by Meiji Seika, but production later began in Singapore and Indonesia. The Singapore bakery facilities started producing other Meiji products in 1974. The biscuits are exported to most developed countries, such as the United Kingdom (by Unisnacks), most European countries, the United States, the Middle East, Australia and Canada.

The biscuits are commonly sold in a tall, hexagonal box with 2 oz or 57.5 g. In some countries, Hello Panda biscuits are available in small 21 and 35 g aluminium pouches, 50 g as well as 260 g boxes and limited edition packages. While the boxes come in sizes of 60 g (20 cookies), 170 g (hexagonal boxes containing eight bags weighing 21 g) and 680 g (a box containing 32 bags weighing 21 g). Packets can also be bought containing a mixture of flavors.

Flavors 

 Chocolate
 Strawberry
 Vanilla
 Matcha green tea
 Double chocolate
Milk
Milk + Chocolate Biscuit
 Coconut
 Caramel – First introduced in the US in 2020

Nutrition 
Calories: 160 
Serving Size: 10 pieces (30g)

See also
 List of shortbread biscuits and cookies
 Koala's March
 Teddy Grahams
 Tiny Teddy

References

Products introduced in 1979
Biscuit brands
Fictional pandas
Japanese brand foods
Japanese snack food
Shortbread